Manger is a village in Alver municipality in Vestland county, Norway. The village lies in the central part of the island of Radøy, along the Radfjorden.

Manger was the administrative center of Radøy municipality from 1964 until its dissolution in 2020 (when it was merged with Alver).  Before 1964, the village was the administrative center of the municipality of Manger which existed from 1838 until 1964.  Manger Church is located in the village.

References

Villages in Vestland
Alver (municipality)